Asmaradana is a Malaysian television drama series broadcast by Grand Brilliance in 2010. It features Tiz Zaqyah, Shaheizy Sam and Iqram Dinzly. 25 episodes were aired between 9 March and 4 May 2010.

Synopsis
The story tells us about mother of Tengku Farouk (Mustapha Kemal) Rafeah (Wan Maimunah) who do not agree with the preferred Tengku Farouk, young Narimah (Memey) because Narimah is a woman club who has no bloodline.

Narimah despised by Tengku Farouk mother because she is not the same as the degree of this family. Narimah suddenly married to the brother of Tengku Farouk, the Tengku Saiful.

Rafeah have found Narimah was pregnant and then Narimah with Tengku Saiful had been driven out of the house aka the family removed.
Misfortune struck Narimah when Tengku Saiful had died, so Narimah live with her daughter, Azizah (Tiz Zaqyah).

Cast

Main character
Tiz Zaqyah as Tengku Azizah
Shaheizy Sam as Amran
Iqram Dinzly as Fariz

Extended cast
Puteri Sarah Liyana as Mimi
Mustapha Kamal as Tengku Farouk
Rozita Che Wan as Narimah
Norish Karman as Raja Marlia
Natasha Hudson as Aria
Wan Maimunah as Rafeah
Memey Suhaiza as young Narimah

Awards and nominations

References

External links
Asmaradana Official Website

Malaysian drama television series
2010 Malaysian television series debuts
2010 Malaysian television series endings
2010s Malaysian television series
TV3 (Malaysia) original programming